Abdul Ghani Hazari (12 January 1921 – 1976) was a Bangladeshi poet and journalist. He was awarded Ekushey Padak by the Government of Bangladesh in 1990.

Education and career
Hazari got his bachelor's in Philosophy from Calcutta University in 1944. He started his journalistic career in 1947 when he joined Alodan, a weekly magazine published from Kolkata, as an editor.

Works
 Samanya Dhan (1959)
 Katipay Amlar Stri (1965)
 Suryer Sindi (1965)
 Jagrata Pradip (1970)
 Svarnagardabh (1964) 
 Froider Manahsamiksa (1975)
 Kalpenchar Diary (1976)

Awards
 UNESCO Award (1964)
 Bangla Academy Literary Award (1972)
 Ekushey Padak (1990)

References

1921 births
1976 deaths
Bangladeshi male poets
Bangladeshi journalists
University of Calcutta alumni
Recipients of the Ekushey Padak
Recipients of Bangla Academy Award
Date of death missing
People from Sujanagar Upazila
20th-century journalists